Buckingham Valley is a defunct station on the Reading Company's New Hope Branch. The original station building, designed by Furness, Evans & Company in 1891, closed in 1952 and was demolished in 1953. The current station building was relocated to this site from the Valley Forge Scenic Railroad about 1970. 

The station is currently on the line used by the New Hope Railroad. While the station sits dormant, the property is currently used for Maintenance-Of-Way storage.

References

Former Reading Company stations
Former railway stations in Bucks County, Pennsylvania
Frank Furness buildings
Railway stations closed in 1952
Railway stations in the United States opened in 1891